Events from the year 1803 in Denmark.

Incumbents
 Monarch – Christian VII
 Prime minister – Christian Günther von Bernstorff

Events

Undated
 Import of slaves to the Danish West Indies is abolished.
 The Port of Odense is established.
 Bertel Thorvaldsen completes his statue of Jason with the Golden Fleece, his first major succes.

Births
 4 January  Robert Cleaver Chapman, pastor, teacher and evangelist, the apostle of Love (died 1902)
 12 January  Christian Pløyen, jurist and government official (died 1767)
 19 March – Christine Løvmand, artist specializing in painting flowers and still lifes (d. 1872)
 20 April – Christian Hansen, architect (d. 1883)
 8 Marc Ferdinand Thielemann, architect (died 1863)
 23 April – Heinrich Gustav Ferdinand Holm, artist and engraver (d. 1861)
 2 May – Albert Küchler, painter active in Italy (d. 1886)
 17 May – Martinus Rørbye, painter (d. 1848)
 4 September – Anna Nielsen, mezzo-soprano (died 1856)
 5 October - Friedrich Bernhard Westphal, painter (d. 1844)
 4 December  Knut Jungbohn Clement, linguist (doed 1873)
 31 December
 Alfred Hage, merchant and landowner (died 1872)
 Emilie da Fonseca, actress and opera singer (died 1884)

Deaths
 18 January  Frederik Christian Kaas, naval officer (born 1725)
 6 February  Peder Rosenstand-Goiske, lawyer and playwright (born 1752)
 4 June  Peter Ascanius, natural scientist (born 1723)

References

 
1800s in Denmark
Denmark
Years of the 19th century in Denmark